The inaugural Solheim Cup competition took place in Orlando, Florida, United States at Lake Nona Golf & Country Club from November 16 to November 18, 1990. The United States team beat the European team 11 points to 4.

Teams

 Europe
 Mickey Walker (Captain) - England
 Helen Alfredsson - Gothenburg, Sweden
 Laura Davies - Coventry, England
 Marie-Laure de Lorenzi - Biarritz, France
 Trish Johnson - Bristol, England
 Liselotte Neumann - Finspång, Sweden
 Alison Nicholas - Gibraltar
 Dale Reid - Ladybank, Scotland
 Pam Wright - Torphins, Scotland

Kathy Whitworth (Captain) - Monahans, Texas
Pat Bradley - Westford, Massachusetts
Beth Daniel - Charleston, South Carolina
Cathy Gerring - Fort Wayne, Indiana
Rosie Jones - Santa Ana, California
Betsy King - Reading, Pennsylvania
Nancy Lopez - Torrance, California
Dottie Mochrie - Saratoga Springs, New York
Patty Sheehan - Middlebury, Vermont

Format
A total of 16 points were available. Day 1 was four rounds of foursomes. Day 2 was four rounds of fourball matches. The final 8 points were decided in a round of singles matchplay. All eight golfers from each team played on each day.

Day one foursomes
Friday, November 16, 1990

Day two fourball
Saturday, November 17, 1990

Day three singles
Sunday, November 18, 1990

External links
1990 Solheim Cup Match Results

Solheim Cup
Golf in Orlando, Florida
Sports competitions in Orlando, Florida
Solheim Cup
Solheim Cup
Solheim Cup
Solheim Cup
1990s in Orlando, Florida
Women's sports in Florida